Man's Work is a television series produced in the United Kingdom which broadcasts on the UK channel Bravo. It features Ashley Hames, who has to trial some of the toughest, hardest & demanding jobs on the planet. *

Episode list
Episode 1 – Alaskan King Crab Fisherman (Alaska)
Episode 2 – Logger (Canada)
Episode 3 – Drugs Cop (Colombia)
Episode 4 – Fireman (Canada)
Episode 5 – Crime Scene Cleaner (USA)
Episode 6 – Opal Mining (Australia)
Episode 7 – Montego Bay Coastguard (Jamaica)
Episode 8 – Volunteer Fireman (Australia)
Episode 9 – Football Manager (England)
Episode 10 – Stuntman (New Zealand)
Episode 11 – Gaucho (Brazil)
Episode 12 – Aussie Rules Ruckman (Australia)
Episode 13 – Mountain Rescue (Australia)

See also
Bravo

References

External links

Man's Work at BRAVO.co.uk

2006 British television series debuts
2006 British television series endings
Bravo (British TV channel) original programming
2000s British documentary television series
2000s British television miniseries
Television series by Endemol
English-language television shows